The Billboard Hot 100 is a chart that ranks the best-performing songs in the United States, published by Billboard magazine. In the 2000s, each chart's "week ending" date was the Saturday of the following two weeks. The data were compiled by Nielsen SoundScan based collectively on each single's weekly physical (CD, vinyl and cassette) and digital sales, airplay, and streaming. Only songs released as physical singles were counted prior to 1998, when Billboard magazine allowed airplay-only singles to chart. While Nielsen had begun tracking digital sales since 2003 for the component chart Digital Songs, it was not until the chart dated February 12, 2005, that digital performance was officially recognized as a performance indicator on the Hot 100, in the wake of decreasing traditional physical sales. On August 4, 2007, Billboard added online streaming to its methodology.

Throughout the decade, a total of 129 singles claimed the top spot of the Hot 100. While Santana's "Smooth" featuring Rob Thomas topped the chart in the first two weeks of 2000, it was not counted as a number-one single of the 2000s decade by Billboard because it had topped the chart in October 1999, and thus was counted as a number-one single of the 1990s decade only. Overall, the decade saw the dominance of hip hop and R&B releases with dance beats and pop crossover, replacing the 1990s' trend of sentimental ballads. While the first half of the 2000s saw the continued relevance of physical sales, the second half welcomed the dominance of digital sales performance thanks to advancements of the internet, through which music was widely distributed.

During the ten-year period, Usher was the most successful artist, accumulating seven number-one entries and spending 41 weeks on the top spot, more than any other act. Beyoncé followed with five number ones and 36 weeks atop the chart, the most among female musicians. Other artists with at least four number-one singles were Rihanna (five) and Mariah Carey, Alicia Keys, 50 Cent, Ludacris, Nelly and Justin Timberlake (four each), and other musicians who spent more than 20 weeks on the chart include The Black Eyed Peas (26), Nelly (23), 50 Cent (23) and Alicia Keys (22). Mariah Carey's "We Belong Together" was the best-performing Hot 100 single of the decade, spending 14 non-consecutive weeks at number one in 2005. It was also the longest-running number-one single, tying with The Black Eyed Peas's "I Gotta Feeling", which topped the Hot 100 for 14 weeks in 2009. Eminem's "Lose Yourself", Usher's "Yeah!" featuring Lil Jon and Ludacris, and The Black Eyed Peas's "Boom Boom Pow" tied for the runner-up position of the second most weeks at number one, each spending 12 weeks.

Number-one entries
Key
 – Number-one single of the year

Note: The best-performing singles on the Billboard Hot 100 of 2000 and 2001 were Faith Hill's "Breathe" and Lifehouse's "Hanging by a Moment", respectively. Both of the singles peaked at number two, and thus are not included here.

Statistics

Artists by total number of weeks at number one 
The following artists spent the most weeks at number one on the chart during the 2000s. A number of artists claimed number-one positions as either the lead artist or a featured artist. Rihanna's "Umbrella" featuring Jay-Z, for example, was counted for both artists because they are both credited on the single. This also applies to the subsequent statistics.

Artists by total number of number-one entries 
While some artists appeared at number one as a solo artist and a member of a group, they were only counted as a solo artist. Justin Timberlake, for example, claimed the top spot with four singles credited as a solo singer and one single as part of 'N Sync, but was only counted separately from 'N Sync.

 Note: For singer Beyoncé, if Destiny's Child is included, she would have eight number-one singles, surpassing Usher for the most number-one singles for the decade.
 Note: For singer Fergie, if The Black Eyed Peas is included, she would have five number-one singles
 Note: For singer Justin Timberlake, if N'Sync is included, he would have five number-one singles.

Songs by total number of weeks at number-one

References
Notes

Footnotes

United States Hot 100
 2000s